The II Corps was a unit of the Finnish Army during the Winter War.

The II Corps with the III Corps formed the Army of the Isthmus (Kannaksen armeija). The corps was commanded by Lieutenant General Harald Öhquist.

The corps fought in the fierce battles around Summa and in the defence of Viipuri.

Order of battle

II Corps 
1st Division
4th Division
5th Division
6th Division - attached on 19 December
11th Division
23rd Division - arrived in February 1940

Delaying groups 
Delaying groups operational only in the opening phase of the war:
Group Uusikirkko
Cavalry Brigade
Jaeger Battalion 1
Group Muolaa
Jaeger Battalion 3
Group Lipola
Jaeger Battalion 2

Commander 
 Lieutenant General Harald Öhquist (30.11.1939 - 13.03.1940).

References 
 
 

Military units and formations of Finland in the Winter War
Military units and formations of Finland in World War II